The national parks of Italy are protected natural areas terrestrial, marine, fluvial or lacustrine, which contain one or more intact ecosystems (or only partially altered by anthropic interventions) and/or one or more physical, geological, geomorphological, biological formations of national and international interest, for naturalistic, scientific, cultural, aesthetic, educational or recreational values, such as to justify the intervention of the State for their conservation.

The parks are managed by the Ministry of the Environment based in Rome.

List of Italian national parks

Parks established before the World War II

Parks established from the post-war period up to the 1980s

Parks established in the 1990s

Parks established in the 2000s

Parks established in 2010s

See also

Conservation in Italy
List of regional parks of Italy
List of Marine Protected Areas of Italy

References

Bibliography

External links



 
Italy
National parks
National parks